Silver Town is the fourth studio album by The Men They Couldn't Hang. It was released in 1989 under the Silvertone label and recorded at Woodcray Manor Studios in Berkshire. There were three singles released from the album, "A Place in the Sun", "Rain, Steam and Speed" and "A Map of Morocco". "Rosettes" was originally earmarked as a single but was cancelled due to the Hillsborough disaster as the song's lyrical content centred on the football hooligan culture at the time.

The title of the track "Rain, Steam and Speed" was taken from the painting Rain, Steam and Speed – The Great Western Railway by J.M.W. Turner, which is in the National Gallery in London. It was the only single released from the album which had a promotional video. It was shot in black and white and featured the band members and some of their family members dressed in Victorian clothing. Lead singer Swill portrays engineer Isambard Kingdom Brunel who is mentioned during the song's bridge.

Track listing
"Rosettes"
"A Place in the Sun"
"Homefires"
"Diamonds, Gold and Fur"
"Company Town"
"Lobotomy, Gets 'Em Home"
"Blackfriars Bridge"
"Rain, Steam and Speed"
"Down All the Days"
"Hellfire and Damnation"
"El Vaquero"

Re-master release 
The album was re-released as a re-mastered CD in 2010 with 6 bonus tracks and a booklet containing new interview with the group by Jerry Ewing with additional photos supplied by the band.  The bonus tracks on the release are:

 Rubber Bullets (B side single)
 The Day the Clocks Went Back (B side single)
 Rosettes (Extended Mix)
 A Place in the Sun (Demo)
 Rain Speed and Steam (Demo)
 A Map of Morocco  (A side single)

Personnel
Swill - vocals, acoustic guitar, penny whistle
Stefan Cush - vocals, electric guitar, guttural sounds
Paul Simmonds - lead guitar, 12-string guitar, electric mandolin, electric bouzouki
Ricky McGuire - bass
Nick Muir - piano, organ, accordion, backing vocals
Jon Odgers - drums, percussion
Lindsay Lowe - trumpet
Bobby Valentino - fiddle

Technical
Phil Smee - design
Keith Morris - photography

References

External links 
 Silver Town at Discogs

1989 albums
The Men They Couldn't Hang albums